Three ships of the United States Navy have been named USS Chauncey to honor Commodore Isaac Chauncey.

 , was a destroyer, which served from 1901 to 1917.
 , was a  during World War II.

Sources

United States Navy ship names